Refund may refer to:

 Product return, a process in which a customer returns a product to the original retailer in exchange for money previously paid
 Money back guarantee - a guarantee that, if a buyer is not satisfied with a product or service, a refund will be made.
 Tax refund - refund on taxes when the tax liability is less than the taxes paid.
 Refunding - when a debt holders calls back bonds with the express purpose of reissuing new debt.
 Deposit-refund system - a surcharge on a product when purchased and a rebate when it is returned.
 Tax-free shopping - allows shoppers to get a refund of any sales tax.
 Refund (horse) - won the 1888 Preakness Stakes

See also 
 Rebate (marketing)